The 2014 edition of the Canadian Polaris Music Prize was presented on September 22, 2014 at The Carlu event theatre in Toronto, Ontario. Actor Jay Baruchel was the host of the ceremony.

The grand jury for the 2014 award consisted of Adam Bowie of The Daily Gleaner, Lorraine Carpenter of CultMTL, Stephen Cooke of the Chronicle-Herald, Jessica Émond-Ferrat of Métro's Montreal edition, Luke Fox of Exclaim!, Melody Lau of Much, Julia LeConte of NOW, Stephanie McKay of the Saskatoon Star-Phoenix, Mark Teo of Aux, and freelance music journalists Liisa Ladouceur and Alan Ranta.

Tanya Tagaq won the award for her album Animism. During the gala before the award winner was announced, Tagaq had given what was widely considered the standout performance of the evening, performing in front of a scrolling list of names of missing and murdered Indigenous women, and garnering the event's only standing ovation.

Shortlist
The ten-album shortlist was announced on July 15.

Longlist

The prize's preliminary 40-album longlist was announced on June 19 at the Sled Island festival in Calgary, Alberta. Nominations were announced by Dan Boeckner of Wolf Parade, Mark Sasso of Elliott Brood, broadcaster Dave Hodge and Calgary mayor Naheed Nenshi.

On June 24, the prize committee amended the longlist to include Greg MacPherson's album Fireball, announcing that the album had made the Top 40 in the voting but was erroneously omitted due to a tabulation error. The committee opted not to drop another album from the longlist to compensate for MacPherson's addition, and went into the second round of voting with a 41-album longlist.

References

External links
 Polaris Music Prize

2014 in Canadian music
2014 music awards
2014